Acidianus sulfidivorans  is a species of archaeon. It is an extremely thermoacidophilic, obligately chemolithotrophic archaeon. It was first isolated from a solfatara on Lihir Island. Its cells are non-motile, Gram-negative, irregular-shaped cocci, 0.5-1.5 micrometres in size. It oxidises sulphur. The type strain is JP7(T) (=DSM 18786(T)=JCM 13667(T)).

References

Further reading

Plumb, J., Haddad, C., and Franzmann, P. (2008). A novel extremophile Acidianus sulfidivorans sp. nov. from island paradise to industrial potential. International Society for Microbial Ecology Conference, August 2008, Cairns.

External links

LPSN
Type strain of Acidianus sulfidivorans at BacDive -  the Bacterial Diversity Metadatabase

Thermophiles
Acidophiles